Devosia chinhatensis is a Gram-negative, rod-shaped non-spore-forming motile bacteria from the genus of Devosia.

References

External links
Type strain of Devosia chinhatensis at BacDive -  the Bacterial Diversity Metadatabase

Hyphomicrobiales
Bacteria described in 2008